This is a list of active power stations in Tasmania, Australia. Candidates for this list must already be commissioned and capable of generating  or more of electricity.

Gas

Thermal gas 
These power stations use gas combustion to power steam turbines that generate some or all of the electricity they produce.

Gas turbine 
These gas turbine power stations use gas combustion to generate some or all of the electricity they produce.

Note that the above three power stations are in fact the same power station listed upon commissioning after conversion to gas and recommissioning after a turbine upgrade.  It has been decommissioned since 2009.

Gas (reciprocating) 
These power stations use gas combustion in reciprocating engines to generate some or all of the electricity they produce.

Hydroelectric 
These hydroelectric power stations use the flow of water to generate some or all of the electricity they produce.

Wind farms 
These wind farm power stations use the power of the wind to generate some or all of the electricity they produce.

See also 

 Energy in Australia
 List of power stations in Australia

References

External links 
 https://web.archive.org/web/20060819123555/http://www.hydro.com.au/Storages/Storage.pdf
 https://web.archive.org/web/20060819112117/http://www.hydro.com.au/Home/Energy/
 NEMMCO List of Generators
 List of Green Power approved generators
 Australian Business Council for Sustainable Energy
 Map of Power Station Locations in the NEM

Tasmania
Tasmania, active
 List
Power stations
Power stations